Cinderella Chef, aka Meng Qi Shi Shen, Adorable Food Goddess, is a donghua ONA series aired in 2018, published by Yuewen Animation and produced by Wawayu Animation in Hangzhou. The animation was adapted from the eponymous online novel written by Ziyi 281.

Plot
Ye Jiayao is a modern-day celebrity chef who loves traditional Chinese recipes and often experiments with them. However, when a food experiment goes wrong, she 
travels back in time to the ancient times, where she becomes the daughter of a magistrate with the name Ye Jin Xuan. When she wakes up she is suddenly kidnapped to Hei Fang Camp where she meets the leader of the bandits, Xia Chun Yu, the young master of the Jing An Marquis manor, who is actually an undercover agent for the king. He had infiltrated the Black Wind Fortress bandits to investigate a plot to overthrow the king. The two then get engaged in a fake marriage. Ye Jia Yao starts to win over hearts, including Xia Chun Yu's, with her superb cooking skills and modern street smarts.

Characters

References

External links
Official page on bilibili
Official page on Youtube

2018 Chinese television series debuts
Chinese animated television series
Mandarin-language television shows
Television shows based on Chinese novels
Cooking in anime and manga